The Navy Midshipmen women's lacrosse team is an NCAA Division I college lacrosse team representing the United States Naval Academy as part of the Patriot League. They play their home games at Navy-Marine Corps Memorial Stadium in Annapolis, Maryland.

Head coach

The Midshipmen are led by hall of fame coach Cindy Timchal, who was named the team's inaugural head coach on August 5, 2006 and has guided the team since its 2008 inception. Timchal is the winningest coach in NCAA Division I women's lacrosse history, earning her 500th win on March 31, 2018.

A 1976 graduate of West Chester University, Timchal began coaching as an assistant lacrosse and field hockey coach at the University of Pennsylvania in 1979. Her first Division I head coach gig was at Northwestern University in 1982. She led the Wildcats to 5 NCAA Tournaments in nine seasons. In 1991 Timchal moved to the University of Maryland, where she transformed a school with one national title in its first eight seasons into a national juggernaut. In 16 seasons, Timchal won eight national titles, reached eleven title games, and made the NCAA Tournament every year.

Timchal's Midshipmen made an immediate impact. After coaching the club team to an 18-5 record in 2007, Navy made the jump to Division I the next year and has won at least 13 games in each of its first ten seasons. Navy broke through in 2010, capturing the Patriot League title for its first NCAA Tournament appearance. They beat Sacred Heart in the play-in game before falling to North Carolina in the first round to finish the year 17-4 with a #19 national ranking. This began a stretch of four straight conference titles and NCAA appearances. The Midshipmen won play-in games three years in a row from 2010–12 and added a first-round victory over Monmouth in 2013. For those four years, Navy's dominance in the Patriot League was hardly contested—they went 21-3 in league play with three regular season titles and four tournament titles.

However, Loyola joined the league in 2014, led by its own all-star coach, Jen Adams. Adams was Timchal's star player at Maryland from 1998-2001, as they had captured four straight national titles together and Adams still holds many Maryland scoring records. Loyola instantly dominated the league, winning three straight conference and tournament titles, preventing the Midshipmen from qualifying again from 2014-16. Loyola completed its fourth straight unbeaten Patriot League regular season in 2017, and faced Navy in the tournament final. The Midshipmen stunned the Greyhounds 15-5, ending Loyola's 41-game unbeaten streak against PL teams. This win kicked off a Cinderella run for the Midshipmen, who defeated three teams in the NCAA tournament--#7 Penn, Massachusetts, and #2 North Carolina—before falling 16-14 to fellow underdog Boston College in the national semifinals. Navy's run marked the first time a women's service academy team had made a Division I national semifinal, and the Midshipmen ended the year 18-5, ranked #4 in the final Inside Lacrosse Media Poll and #6 in the IWLCA Coaches Poll.

Individual career records

Reference:

Individual single-season records

Seasons

Postseason Results

The Midshipmen have appeared in 6 NCAA tournaments. Their postseason record, not including play-in games, is 6-6.

References

 
2008 establishments in Maryland
Lacrosse clubs established in 2008